Latin is the third album from improvisational electronic band Holy Fuck.  It was placed on the Long List for the 2010 Polaris Music Prize.  In the United States, the album reached #14 on the Billboard Dance charts and #40 on the Heatseekers chart.

Track listing
"1MD" - 4:09
"Red Lights" - 3:49
"Latin America" - 4:49
"Stay Lit" - 3:20
"Silva & Grimes" - 5:14
"SHT MTN" - 2:52
"Stilettos" - 3:56
"Lucky" - 4:11
"P.I.G.S." - 6:03
iTunes bonus tracks
"Jungles - 3:40
"Grease Fire" - 4:43

Personnel
 Brian Borcherdt - Keyboards, effects, composer
 Graham Walsh - Keyboards effects, composer, recording engineer
 Matt "Punchy" McQuaid - Bass, composer
 Matt Schulz - Drums, composer
 Shaun Brodie - Trumpet ("Stay Lit")
 Eli Janney - Mixing ("1MD" (w/ Holy Fuck), "Latin America," "Lucky")
 Dave Newfeld - Mixing ("Red Lights," "Stay Lit," "SHT MTN," "P.I.G.S.")
 D. Sardy - Mixing ("Stilettos")
 Ryan Jenning - Mixing engineer ("Stilettos")
 Paul Epworth - Mixing ("Silva & Grimes")
 Mandy Parnell - Mastering
 Bjorn Copeland - Artwork
 Mikael Gregorsky - Photography
 James Mejia - Art, layout, design (w/ Holy Fuck)

References 

Holy Fuck albums
2010 albums
Young Turks (record label) albums